Doriano Marvin Kortstam (born 7 July 1994) is a Dutch-born Curaçaoan professional footballer who plays as a defender for Dutch club TEC.

Club career
He made his professional debut in the Eerste Divisie for Achilles '29 on 6 February 2017 in a game against Eindhoven.

Honours

International
Curaçao
 Caribbean Cup: 2017

References

External links
 
 

1994 births
Footballers from Rotterdam
Curaçao footballers
Curaçao expatriate footballers
Curaçao international footballers
Living people
Feyenoord players
SV SVV players
SC Veendam players
Nike Academy players
MFK Zemplín Michalovce players
FK Slavoj Trebišov players
Roda JC Kerkrade players
Achilles '29 players
FC Eindhoven players
Platanias F.C. players
Orihuela CF players
Eerste Divisie players
2. Liga (Slovakia) players
Football League (Greece) players
Super League Greece 2 players
Segunda División B players
2017 CONCACAF Gold Cup players
Association football defenders
Expatriate footballers in England
Expatriate footballers in Slovakia
Expatriate footballers in Greece
Expatriate footballers in Spain
Curaçao expatriate sportspeople in England
Curaçao expatriate sportspeople in Slovakia